The following is a list of reservoirs in Singapore.

There are a currently 17 reservoirs which are designated as national water catchment areas and are managed by the Public Utilities Board (PUB) of Singapore.

Reservoirs 

*located in SAF restricted zones

Reservoirs that are currently in service

Reservoirs that are no longer in service
 Mount Emily Reservoir
 Keppel Hill Reservoir

References

 
 
Singapore
Dams
Reservoirs